Stroe may refer to:

Places 
 Stroe, Gelderland, a village in the Netherlands
 Stroe, North Holland, a village in the Netherlands
 Stroe, a tributary of the river Nechit in Romania

Name

Romanian surname 
 Aurel Stroe (1932–2008)
 Corneliu Stroe (1949–2017)
 Giuliano Stroe (born 2004)
 Radu Stroe (born 1949)

Romanian male given name 
 Stroe Belloescu (1838–1912)

See also 
 Stroești (disambiguation)
 Stroiești (disambiguation)

Romanian-language surnames
Romanian masculine given names